Daughter of the Mountains is a children's novel by Louise Rankin. It tells the story of Momo, a Tibetan girl who undertakes a long and difficult journey to save her little dog Pempai, a Lhasa Terrier from the wool trader who stole him. The novel, illustrated by Kurt Wiese, was first published in 1948 and was a Newbery Honor recipient in 1949.

References

External links

 

1948 American novels
 American children's novels
 Newbery Honor-winning works
 Novels set in Tibet
 Novels set in India
 Children's novels about animals
 Viking Press books
1948 children's books
Books illustrated by Kurt Wiese